"Axegrinder" is a song by Australian rock group Hoodoo Gurus. It was released on RCA Records in July 1989 as the second single from their fourth studio album Magnum Cum Louder. The song peaked at number 58 on the ARIA charts.

In June 2000, Dave Faulkner said "I often describe 'Axegrinder' as the song that 'killed' Magnum Cum Louder. We had enjoyed considerable airplay for 'Come Anytime' but 'Axegrinder' stopped everything cold. Funnily enough, it became one of our biggest showstoppers in concert within 12 months.".

Track listing
 7" single (RCA Victor  105 071)
 "Axegrinder" — 3:27
 "Spaghetti Western" — 3:23

Personnel
Credits:
 Richard Grossman — bass, backing vocals  
 Dave Faulkner — lead vocals, guitar, keyboards
 Mark Kingsmill — drums, vocals (grunts)
 Brad Shepherd — guitar, backing vocals, harmonica
 Producer — Hoodoo Gurus
 Engineer — Alan Thorne
 Mixer — David Thoener

Charts

References

1989 singles
Hoodoo Gurus songs
1989 songs
RCA Records singles
Songs written by Dave Faulkner (musician)